Cam FM (formerly known as Cambridge University Radio and later CUR1350) is a student-run radio station at the University of Cambridge and Anglia Ruskin University. The station broadcasts on an FM frequency of 97.2 MHz and online. It currently broadcasts from Fitzwilliam College and Anglia Ruskin University after spending its first 32 years located in Churchill College. Cam FM once held the world record for the longest team broadcast marathon, at 76 hours.

In 2009, Cam FM was awarded an FM Community Licence by UK Broadcasting Regulator Ofcom. The station, then known as CUR1350, took on its current name and launched its FM service in October 2010. The station is a wholly owned subsidiary of Cambridge and Anglia Ruskin Student Radio Ltd, which is also the FM licence holder.

Cam FM disaffiliated from the Student Radio Association in 2015, despite once winning Best Station at the Association's Student Radio Awards 2007 as CUR1350. However has rejoined the SRA in 2019.

Cam FM is managed by a committee of annually elected students and alumni of the University of Cambridge and Anglia Ruskin University.

History
In early 1979, Simon Cooper, Ellie Buchanan, and David Clouter at the student-run Cambridge University Broadcasting Society founded a radio station which was granted permission to install induction loops around the Cambridge colleges of Churchill and later New Hall, allowing residents to listen to Cambridge University Radio (as it was then known) over a short-range, mono, mediumwave broadcast. The station subsequently became CUR945.

Despite successfully applying for a number of short-term FM licences, CUR was unable to continuously broadcast to the University community, and so struggled to achieve widespread popularity.

The explosive growth of the Internet, along with many colleges installing high-speed Ethernet connections in student rooms, prompted the station to launch a simultaneous webcast in 1998. This allowed students from throughout the University to listen whenever they were near a computer. In 2004, the internet audio webcasts were upgraded, and in 2005 an enhanced online player was launched.

Additionally, in 2002 the station successfully applied for a long-term, low-powered AM licence. Broadcasting on 1350 kHz, the station was then known as CUR1350.

In 2006, CUR1350 launched a project to install a cable service to multiple sites across the University of Cambridge and ARU. Dubbed "CURintheBAR" the station is distributed via the universities' LAN network to receiving units positioned in student bars and cafes where it is relayed over loudspeakers.

In March 2009, the station was granted an FM Community Radio Licence by the UK regulator Ofcom, to become the only FM radio station targeting members of Cambridge University and Anglia Ruskin University. Regular programmes from the rebranded Cam FM began on the new frequency of 97.2 FM in October 2010.

Cam FM is financially self-sufficient via on-air and on-line advertising and yearly membership fees. Profits are invested back into the station to improve the service for listeners and the experience for station members. The station receives no funding from either university or any student union.

Current broadcasts
Cam FM currently broadcasts continuously, with an automated playout system filling the intervals between live broadcasts. During term time, much of the station's output is live between the hours of 8am and 1am. Programmes are produced and presented by undergraduate and postgraduate students and alumni at both the University of Cambridge and the Cambridge campus of Anglia Ruskin University. A majority of programmes are specialist music shows (e.g. drum and bass, indie rock, UK garage), though others are aimed at a wider audience (e.g. their breakfast show, theatre/film review show, or local news coverage).

Most of the technology used by Cam FM is developed in-house: (such as the automated playout system, computerised playout systems and audio routing in the studio) enabling the station to be built to specification.

Awards
In 2004  the station won four awards in the annual Student Radio Awards. The presenter Val Mellon (now heard on the national DAB station Core—see below) won a gold award for Best Entertainment Show, as well as a bronze award for Best Female. A further gold award was presented to the station for Technical Achievement, in recognition of the station's platform-independent webcast system. A silver award was also given to the station for Best Sports Programming, in respect of the station's live coverage of the annual Oxford vs. Cambridge rugby union Varsity match. Sports coverage also earned the station a silver award in 2003, for their annual coverage of the May Bumps—an inter-collegiate rowing competition held on the River Cam.

In 2005  CUR1350 was nominated for 4 awards, the 2005 awards seeing twice as many competing entries as the previous year. The nominations for CUR1350 were: Technical Achievement - for the wireless internet link for the Bumps 2005 tannoy, Sports Broadcasting (Ed Bolton) - for The Sports Show including interviews with Chris Eubank, Specialist Music (Samuel Green) - for "Kol Cambridge" the UK's only broadcast Israeli/Jewish radio show, Station of the Year.

In 2007, CUR1350 was nominated for a station-record of nine Student Radio Awards, making it the most nominated station of 2007.
These were for Best Technical Innovation, three for Best Entertainment Programme (Charles Lyon's Weekend Breakfast, Jaine Sykes' Rock Paper Scissors and Ella Belsham and Alex-James Painter's Morning Glory), Best Specialist Music Programme (Tobias Bown's Volume 11), Newcomer of the Year (Jaine Sykes), two for Best Female Presenter (Katherine Godfrey and Jaine Sykes), and Station of the Year (Michael Brooks et al.). 2007 was a successful year for CUR1350 as it scooped a Bronze SRA for Best Entertainment Programme with Charles Lyons' Weekend Breakfast and a Gold SRA for Katherine Godfrey in the Best Female category. CUR1350 also won Gold for Station of the Year for the first time in its 29-year history.

In 2008, CUR1350 was nominated for Station of the year, Specialist Music (Sandy Mill), Outside Broadcast (The May Bumps) and Best Station. The station won Gold for Best Chart Show (Presenter Charles Lyons). This was also the SRA national chart show's inaugural year.

In 2009, CUR1350 received two nominations at the Student Radio Awards. These were for Best Student Radio Chart Show (Tobias Bown and Simon Ruggles) and for Best Event/Outside Broadcast for the May Bumps 2009.

In 2012, Cam FM were awarded a bronze for Best OB/Live event in respect of their coverage of the 2012 May Bumps rowing competition. Cam FM were also nominated for Best Speech for the Fo' Show, and the Best Station award.

The Kevin Greening Award is named in honour of the late BBC Radio One presenter whose career in radio started at CUR.

Alumni

Several of the station's members have subsequently achieved considerable success in the wider world of radio & television broadcasting. Notable examples include:
 Kevin Greening, a presenter on BBC Radio 1 throughout the latter half of the 1990s, went on to present on 102.2 Smooth FM, which broadcasts across Greater London, until his untimely death aged 44 in December 2007.
 Matthew Price is now the BBC's Europe Correspondent, having previously been BBC's New York Correspondent and Middle East Correspondent.
 Spencer Kelly is presenter of the BBC TV programme Click Online and formerly presenter on Ocean FM broadcasting across Portsmouth and Southampton.
 Martin Steers is the Station Manager of NLive Radio in Northampton, and the Founder and Chair of the UK National Community Radio Awards, and Founder and Manager of Scout Radio.

The station once held annual alumni days, on which former members were invited back to once again produce and present shows for listeners within the University.

References

External links
 Cam FM official website

Radio stations in Cambridgeshire and Peterborough
Radio stations established in 1979
Organisations associated with the University of Cambridge
Culture of the University of Cambridge
Student radio in the United Kingdom
Churchill College, Cambridge
St John's College, Cambridge
Anglia Ruskin University